Trincomali Channel is a channel located in the Gulf Islands of British Columbia, Canada.

Etymology
Trincomali Channel is named for the ship HMS Trincomalee, which was assigned to the Royal Navy's Pacific Station at Esquimalt from 1852 to 1856.

Geography
Trincomali Channel is located between Pylades Island to the north; Thetis, Penelakut, and Salt Spring Islands to the west; Valdes and Galiano Islands to the east; and Prevost Island to the south. Active Pass and Porlier Pass link the channel to the Strait of Georgia at the south and north ends of Galiano Island, respectively.

The channel contains several islands, the largest being Parker Island located southwest of Galiano Island.

See also
Active Pass
Sansum Narrows

References

External links
The Friends of HMS Trincomalee website

Landforms of the Gulf Islands
Channels of British Columbia
Straits of British Columbia